Zdenko Kobeščak (born 3 December 1943) is a Croatian retired football player. He earned two caps for Yugoslavia in th 1960s.

Playing career

Club
Kobeščak made his official debut for Dinamo Zagreb in August 1962 against Partizan Belgrade, but his career at Dinamo was hampered by injuries. He played in both legs of the lost 1963 Inter-Cities Fairs Cup Final against Valencia but did not feature in Dinamo's 1967 Fairs Cup win. He played a total of 191 games for the club.

International
He made his debut for Yugoslavia in an October 1963 friendly match away against Romania and earned a total of 2 caps, scoring no goals. His second and final international was a November 1964 friendly against the Soviet Union.

Managerial career
He was an assistant coach to Mirko Jozić at the 1990 UEFA European Under-16 Football Championship.

References

External links
 
 Profile on Serbian federation official site

1943 births
Living people
Sportspeople from Zagreb
Association football midfielders
Yugoslav footballers
Yugoslavia international footballers
GNK Dinamo Zagreb players
NK Zagreb players
NK Maribor players
Stade Rennais F.C. players
Montluçon Football players
Yugoslav First League players
Ligue 1 players
Yugoslav expatriate footballers
Expatriate footballers in France
Yugoslav expatriate sportspeople in France
Yugoslav football managers
Croatian football managers
GNK Dinamo Zagreb managers
GNK Dinamo Zagreb non-playing staff